Junrey Balawing (born June 12, 1993 – July 28, 2020) was a Filipino record holder at the Guinness World Records for the  world's shortest man alive measuring at  tall. The declaration came during Balawing's 18th birthday celebration.

He stopped growing at the age of 1.

As a result, Junrey held the record for less than a year.

Following the death of Chandra Bahadur Dangi on September 3, 2015, Balawing held the title of the shortest living man until his death at age 27 on July 28, 2020. He had been hospitalized for pneumonia. Prior to his death, he resided in Dapitan with his family.

See also 

List of shortest people

References

1993 births
2020 deaths
People with dwarfism
People from Zamboanga del Norte